This is a list of the graduate schools of theology accredited by the Commission on Accrediting of the Association of Theological Schools in the United States and Canada'''.

References

Theo
Theo
Seminaries and theological colleges in the United States
Seminaries and theological colleges in Canada
Lists of religious schools
Lists of religious schools in the United States
Canada religion-related lists